Pierre Chareau (4 August 1883 – 24 August 1950) was a French architect and designer.

Early life
Chareau was born in Bordeaux, France. He apprenticed at a Paris-based British furniture manufacturer, Waring & Gillow, after he failed his entrance exams to the Ecole des Beaux-Arts.

Work
Chareau designed the first house in France made of steel and glass, the Maison de Verre.

Chareau was a member of Congrès International d'Architecture Moderne.

Move to United States 
Chareau and his wife fled Nazi-occupied Paris to Marseilles and Morocco and eventually settled in the New York. Robert Motherwell commissioned a house in the Hamptons, which would be Chareau's last. Unable to secure another commission, he and his wife survived on the income she made from giving cooking lessons. Though he made efforts to show his work at MOMA and at the Musee National d'Art Moderne in Paris, he died in 1950, relatively unknown and penniless.

Exhibitions 
The Jewish Museum in New York City mounted the exhibition, Pierre Chareau: Modern Architecture and Design which explored the architect's work.

References

Further reading
 Brian Brace Taylor: Pierre Chareau, Taschen, 1998
 Dominique Vellay: La Maison de Verre, Thames & Hudson, 2007
 Marc Vellay and Kenneth Frampton: Pierre Chareau. Architect and Craftsman 1883-1950, Rizzoli, 1990

External links
 Pierre Chareau at pierrechareau-edition.com

20th-century French architects
Architects from Bordeaux
1883 births
1950 deaths
Congrès International d'Architecture Moderne members